Ramandeep Singh may refer to:

Ramandeep Singh (cricketer) (born 1997), Indian cricketer
Ramandeep Singh (field hockey, born 1971)
Ramandeep Singh (field hockey, born 1993)
Ramandeep Singh (footballer)
Ramandeep Singh (medical scientist) Indian medical scientist